John Graves may refer to:

 John Graves (American football) (born 1987), American football defensive tackle
 John Graves (author) (1920–2013), U.S. author
 John Graves (racing driver), American racing driver
 John Graves (rugby league) (1926–1983), Australian rugby league footballer
 John George Graves (1866–1945), English entrepreneur
 John T. Graves (1806–1870), Irish mathematician
 John Temple Graves (1856–1925), American politician
 John Thomas Graves (Confederate soldier) (1842–1950), last surviving Confederate soldier from the American Civil War
 John Woodcock Graves (1795–1886), Anglo-Australian composer and poet
 Tom Graves (John Thomas Graves, Jr., born 1970), U.S. politician

See also
 John Graves Simcoe (1752–1806), Canadian lieutenant governor
 John Graves, a fictional character in 15 Maiden Lane